Red caviar is a caviar made from the roe of salmonid fishes (various species of salmon and trout), which has intense reddish hue. It is distinct from black caviar, which is made from the roe of sturgeon.

Red caviar is part of Russian and Japanese cuisine. In Japan, salmon caviar is known as ikura which derives from Russian word икра (ikra) which means caviar or fish roe in general.

In Japanese cuisine, it is usually marinated in salt or soy sauce and sake. 
The seasoning used varies from household to household. Many families pickle red caviar using only soy sauce, but some use dashi instead of sake or mirin.

Russians enjoy red caviar as an appetizer on buttered bread or on a blini (Slavic pancake). Caviar on blini is often paired with sliced salmon and champagne, especially on such occasions as Russian New Year's Eve. Caviar is also a popular gift among Russians.

Production of Red Caviar

Countries that harvest Pacific salmon, which produce Red Caviar are: Japan, Russia, The United States, and Canada.

References

Roe
Salmonidae
Russian cuisine
Japanese cuisine